Edward Burr Van Vleck (June 7, 1863, Middletown, Connecticut – June 3, 1943, Madison, Wisconsin) was an American mathematician.

Early life
Van Vleck was born June 7, 1863, Middletown, Connecticut. He was the son of astronomer John Monroe Van Vleck, he graduated from Wesleyan University in 1884, attended Johns Hopkins in 1885–87, and studied at Göttingen (Ph.D., 1893). He also received 1 July 1914 an honorary doctorate of the University of Groningen (The Netherlands). He was assistant professor and professor at Wesleyan (1895–1906), and after 1906 a professor at the University of Wisconsin–Madison, where the mathematics building is named after him.  His doctoral students include H. S. Wall. In 1913 he became president of the American Mathematical Society, of whose Transactions he had been first associate editor (1902–05) and then editor (1905–10). He was the author of Theory of Divergent Series and Algebraic Continued Fractions (1903), and of several monographs in mathematical journals. His son, John Hasbrouck Van Vleck, was a notable physicist who received the Nobel Prize in 1977.

Japanese art collector
E. B. Van Vleck is also important art collector, particularly in the medium of Japanese woodblock prints (principally Ukiyo-e), known as Van Vleck Collection. He began collecting around 1909, but became a serious collector in the late 1920s, when he acquired approximately 4,000 prints that had been owned by Frank Lloyd Wright. His collection, one of the largest in the world outside the Library of Congress, features more than 2,000 prints by Utagawa Hiroshige as well as many prints by Hokusai, and fine examples of shin hanga (new prints) made well into the 20th century. His collection now resides at the Chazen Museum of Art in Madison, Wisconsin.

Writings 
 
 
 
 
 Selected topics in the theory of divergent series and of continued fractions (New York; MacMillan, 1905).

See also
Arcsine law
Gauss's continued fraction
Van Vleck polynomials
Van Vleck's theorem
Carol S. Wood, Edward Burr Van Vleck Professor of Mathematics, Emerita at Wesleyan

Notes

External links
 
 

1863 births
1943 deaths
People from Middletown, Connecticut
Wesleyan University alumni
19th-century American mathematicians
20th-century American mathematicians
University of Wisconsin–Madison faculty
Presidents of the American Mathematical Society
American art collectors
Mathematicians from Connecticut